Jeffrey Laurence Overton (born May 28, 1983) is an American professional golfer.

Overton was born in Evansville, Indiana; he graduated from Evansville North High School, leading the Huskies to two State Golf Finals; he finished as State Runner-Up in 1999 (as a sophomore) and then led the Huskies to the State Championship in 2000 as a Junior. He attended Indiana University, graduating in 2005 with a degree in Sports Marketing and Management. Turning pro in 2005, he is currently a member of the PGA Tour. He graduated from Q-School in his first attempt and started to play on the Tour in 2006. His father was a star quarterback at Evansville Harrison High School and for the Indiana State Sycamores.

In 2006, he scored a double eagle (albatross) on the 18th hole at Westchester Country Club during the Barclays Classic as he holed a fairway wood from 239 yards after a 294-yard drive. In 2007, he recorded his best finish, a second place finish at the Wyndham Championship. During the final PGA Tour event of 2008, the Children's Miracle Network Classic, Overton was ten days removed from an appendectomy and was ranked 125th, barely hanging on to a full-season exemption. A 21st-place finish moved him up to 118th and he retained his card for 2009. In 2009, he improved to 76th. 

The following season, 2010, was his best season. He recorded three runner-up finishes that season: at the Zurich Classic of New Orleans, at the HP Byron Nelson Championship, and at the Greenbrier Classic. At the Greenbrier, he held a three-shot lead after 54 holes but could not withstand an amazing 4th round by Stuart Appleby, who shot a round of 59 to win his 9th PGA Tour event. Following this tournament, Overton reached the top 50 of the Official World Golf Ranking for the first time. He also recorded two third place finishes and an 11th place finish at the 2010 Open Championship. He ended 2010 in 12th place on the PGA Tour money list. His strong 2010 season earned him a place on the United States Ryder Cup team; he and teammate Rickie Fowler became the first Americans to make the team without a victory on the PGA Tour. 

In 2015, Overton barely retained his PGA Tour card, finishing 125th in the FedEx Cup.

Having suffered a serious infection after back surgery in 2017, Overton did not start a world ranking event again until the 2022 3M Open.

Amateur wins
2003 Indiana Amateur
2004 Indiana Amateur
2001–05 seven collegiate events
2005 Big Ten Conference Champion

Results in major championships

CUT = Missed the half-way cut
"T" = tied

Results in The Players Championship

CUT = missed the halfway cut
"T" indicates a tie for a place

Results in World Golf Championships

QF, R16, R32, R64 = Round in which player lost in match play
"T" = Tied

U.S. national team appearances
Amateur
Palmer Cup: 2005 (winners)
Walker Cup: 2005 (winners)

Professional
Ryder Cup: 2010

See also
2005 PGA Tour Qualifying School graduates

References

External links

American male golfers
PGA Tour golfers
Ryder Cup competitors for the United States
Golfers from Indiana
Sportspeople from Evansville, Indiana
Sportspeople from Bloomington, Indiana
1983 births
Living people